"Theme from Shaft", written and recorded by Isaac Hayes in 1971, is the soul and funk-styled theme song to the Metro-Goldwyn-Mayer film Shaft. The theme was released as a single (shortened and edited from the longer album version) two months after the movie's soundtrack by Stax Records' Enterprise label. "Theme from Shaft" went to number two on the Billboard Soul Singles chart (behind "Inner City Blues (Make Me Wanna Holler)" by Marvin Gaye) and to number one on the Billboard Hot 100 in the United States in November 1971. The song was also well received by adult audiences, reaching number six on Billboard's Easy Listening chart. The song is considered by some to be one of the first disco songs.

The following year, "Theme from Shaft" won the Academy Award for Best Original Song, with Hayes becoming the first African American to win that honor – or any Academy Award in a non-acting category – as well as the first recipient of the award who both wrote and performed the winning song. Since then, the song has appeared in numerous television shows, commercials, and other movies, including the 2000 sequel Shaft, for which Hayes re-recorded the song. In 2004 the original finished at #38 in AFI's 100 Years...100 Songs survey of top songs in American cinema.

Composition and history
In 2000, Hayes told National Public Radio that he had only agreed to write and record the Shaft score after the film's producer, Joel Freeman, promised him an audition for the lead role, which was taken by a then-unknown Richard Roundtree. Hayes, who also had no acting experience, never got the chance to audition, but kept his end of the deal anyway. Director Gordon Parks also had a hand in composing the theme, describing the character of John Shaft (the "black private dick/who's a sex machine/to all the chicks") to Hayes and explaining that the song had to familiarize the audience with him. Hayes recorded the rhythm parts on the theme first, scored the entire rest of the film, then returned to the theme song.

Hayes told Mojo in 1995:

The opening sixteenth-note hi-hat ride pattern, played by Willie Hall, was drawn from a break on Otis Redding's "Try a Little Tenderness", a Stax record on which Hayes had played. Guitarist Charles Pitts' wah-wah effect was common in 1970s funk; the riff had originally been written for an unfinished Stax song. The synthesized keyboard is played by Hayes. Even on the edited single version, the intro lasts for more than one and a half minutes before any vocals are heard. The arrangement was by Hayes and Johnny Allen.

The lyrics describe John Shaft's coolness, courage and sex appeal and Hayes' lead vocals are punctuated by a trio of female backup singers. At one famous moment, Hayes calls Shaft "a bad mother—;" before the backup singers (one of whom is Tony Orlando and Dawn's Telma Hopkins) interrupt the implied profanity with the line "Shut yo' mouth!" Hayes immediately defends himself by replying "I'm talking about Shaft", with the back-up vocalists replying, "We can dig it." Other well-known passages include "You're damn right!" also uttered by Hayes, and "He's a complicated man/but no one understands him/but his woman/John Shaft."

The song was considered very racy for its time. As late as 1990, censors at the Fox Network thought it too risqué to be sung on The Simpsons (until it was pointed out that the song had been played on television before).

The song was not intended to be a single, but the success of the film and the popularity of the track in nightclubs led to a 45 record of the theme being released on Enterprise Records two months after the soundtrack. Within two months, it hit No. 1 on the Billboard Hot 100 and stayed there a second week. It peaked at No. 4 in the UK Singles Chart. The song had an enormous influence on the disco and soul music of the decade.

In 1972, Hayes performed "Theme from Shaft" as part of the Academy Awards ceremony in his signature chain mail vest, but accepted the Academy Award for Best Original Song later that night wearing a tuxedo. He dedicated his historic win to his grandmother, Rushia Wade, who joined him onstage as he accepted the award. Following the Academy Awards, Hayes, the Rev. Jesse Jackson and the Stax staff dedicated the win to the black community at an Operation PUSH rally. "When it hit so big I was in severe disbelief ..." he later reflected. "Then when it won an Academy Award — it won Best Song, but the album was also nominated for Best Soundtrack — I was in a state of shock. This was after the Academy tried to disqualify it, too, saying, because I can't write music, it wasn't my composition. Quincy Jones got in there and argued my case; saying that, even if I didn't physically write it down, they were my ideas."

Later that year, Hayes performed "Theme from Shaft" live at the Wattstax concert in Los Angeles. Film footage of this performance was recorded for Mel Stuart's documentary film of the concert, but was cut before the film's release due to legal complications with MGM, who would not allow Hayes to perform his Shaft songs in any other film until 1976. A 2003 remastered version of the Wattstax film reinstates Hayes' performance of "Theme from Shaft".

When John Singleton directed an updated version of Shaft in 2000, starring Samuel L. Jackson, Hayes re-recorded the theme for the new film.

In popular culture
 In a 1974 educational film by Film Communicators, "It's Your Life," the Shaft theme was played when a woman entered her house, and went to her bedroom using hair spray.  Afterwards, she tried to light a cigarette with a lighter.  When the song stopped playing, and all of a sudden, the woman's head and hair caught fire and suffered severe burns to her scalp, as a result of her carelessness.  She screamed in pain and tried to put the fire out.
 In 1974, it was used as a theme song for the unsold game show pilot Big Spenders hosted by Pat Harrington.
 The song has been played or parodied in television shows, including The Fresh Prince of Bel-Air (1990–1996), The Simpsons (1989–), Family Guy (1999–), Sesame Street (1969–), Scrubs (2001–2010), The X-Files (1993–2002), Mystery Science Theater 3000, The Fast Show (1994-2000), Father Ted (1995–1998), The Adventures of Jimmy Neutron: Boy Genius (2002–2006), Histeria! (1998–2000), The Wire (2002–2008) and Ashes to Ashes (2008–2010).
 On Sesame Street a parodied version of the song, "Cookie Disco", was about Cookie Monster, dressed as Isaac Hayes, who ends up eating the set.
The song was featured in the Friends episode titled: "The One Where the Monkey Gets Away" (Season 1, Episode 19) to spoof 70s style action movies with slow-motion sequences.
 The song was featured in the 1988 film I'm Gonna Git You Sucka, where one of the characters, John Slade, is a parody on Shaft (Isaac Hayes was in the film in a different role). In the film, Slade counsels a young black action hero named Jack Spade on the importance of theme music: "Every good hero has one." At the end of the film, we find that Spade has followed Slade's advice, exiting the movie to his own theme song, performed by Boogie Down Productions.
 The 1989 comedy film UHF (co-written by and starring "Weird Al" Yankovic) featured a mock trailer segment on television parodying the 1982 movie Gandhi called Gandhi II, set to music meant to resemble the Shaft theme.
 A 1998 Burger King marketing campaign featured Hayes singing a retooled version of the song, with lyrics now alluding to Mr. Potato Head, who is seen dancing on the piano that Hayes plays.
 Another Burger King commercial from 2002 promoted the Shaq Pack, where the lyrics alluded to Shaquille O'Neal.
 Hayes also parodied "Theme from Shaft" with "Two Cool Guys", the opening theme song for the 1996 film Beavis and Butt-Head Do America (1993–1997), in which Hayes adapts the Beavis and Butt-Head television theme as a rhythm guitar line for a "Shaft"-esque song about the title characters.
 In the series Two and a Half Men (2003–2015), there were occasional references to the song, including one episode where Alan, Herb, Gordon, and Jerome are seen singing the song as a barbershop quartet.
 Since very early in the 1970s, the Swedish national television network Sveriges Television sports show on Sundays, Sportspegeln (Sports Mirror), has used different variations of the end of "Theme from Shaft" for its opening theme; roughly the same samples have also been used for daily sports news bulletin Sportnytt.
 Also since the early 1970s, the Canadian Broadcasting Corporation's radio current affairs show As It Happens has used the theme as bumper music.
 An instrumental version of the song served as the news theme for Memphis television station WMC-TV for a time in the 1970s.
 In Australia, an edited instrumental version was used as the theme for "Seven's Big League" rugby league broadcasts hosted by Rex Mossop in the 1970s and 1980s, as well as preview music for upcoming scenes from the Network Ten serial series Number 96 ( 1972–1977).

Covers and samples
Sammy Davis Jr. recorded a cover version of this song titled "John Shaft" with extended lyrics for his 1972 album Sammy Davis Jr. Now.
Maynard Ferguson did a brassy big band version of the song with a slightly different arrangement and released in 1972 on his M.F. Horn Two album.
Joe Bataan recorded a Latin version in 1972.
Ferrante & Teicher recorded an instrumental version on pianos in 1973 from their album, Play the Hit Themes.
 The song was sampled in the 1973 break-in record, "Super Fly Meets Shaft" (US #31).
Tony Orlando and Dawn performed "Shaft" on their 1970s television series, Tony Orlando and Dawn (1974–1976). This was particularly significant, as Telma Hopkins was a backup singer on the Isaac Hayes single. Tony has also performed it in his solo live shows.
Los Angeles punk band Black Randy & The Metrosquad included a cover of the song on their 1979 debut album, Pass the Dust, I Think I'm Bowie.
UK electronic group Cabaret Voltaire recorded a cover version in 1981; it was later given a wider release on 1988's 8 Crepuscule Tracks.
A version by Eddy & The Soul Band was a No. 13 hit in the UK Singles Chart in 1985. This version was used in "Going to America", the final episode of Father Ted.
Young MC sampled it on his "Know How" track off his 1989 album Stone Cold Rhymin'.
UK band The Wedding Present recorded it as part of their 1992 release Hit Parade 2.
Hip hop producer Jake One sampled it for "Hurt U", a song from his 2008 album White Van Music.
Jay-Z sampled the song on the track "Reservoir Dogs" featuring The Lox, Beanie Sigel and Sauce Money from the rappers 1998 Vol. 2... Hard Knock Life album.
French musician Malik Adouane recorded an Arabic version of the song for the Volume 1, CD2 Buddha Bar album (1999) by DJ Claude Challe.
The Ukulele Orchestra of Great Britain on their 2007 album Precious Little.
UK psychedelic rock band Complex recorded a version in 1972. Intended for their third album, it was not released until 2022, as part of the band's box set Live for the Minute.

Personnel
 Isaac Hayes – lead vocals, keyboards, lyrics, arrangements
 Pat Lewis – backing vocals
 Rose Williams – backing vocals
 Mitchell Butler – backing vocals
 Telma Hopkins – backing vocals
 Lester Snell – electric piano
 David Becker – viola
 Charles Pitts – guitar
 Michael Toles – guitar
 Marc "Dr. Love" Davis – guitar solo
 James Alexander – bass guitar
 Richard "Johnny" Davis – trumpet
 John Fonville – flute
 Gary Jones – congas
 Willie Hall – drums

See also
 List of Billboard Hot 100 number-one singles of 1971

References

External links
 
 

Film theme songs
1971 singles
1971 songs
Best Original Song Academy Award-winning songs
Billboard Hot 100 number-one singles
Cashbox number-one singles
Songs written by Isaac Hayes
Shaft
Funk songs
Disco songs
Shaft (franchise)
Songs about fictional male characters
Grammy Award for Best Engineered Album, Non-Classical